Tylomelania gemmifera is a species of freshwater snail with an operculum, an aquatic gastropod mollusk in the family Pachychilidae.

Distribution 
This species occurs in Malili lakes, Sulawesi, Indonesia. It occurs in one lake; the type locality is Lake Matano.

Description 
The shell has 9-10 whorls.

References

External links 
 von Rintelen T. & Glaubrecht M. (2005). "Anatomy of an adaptive radiation: a unique reproductive strategy in the endemic freshwater gastropod Tylomelania (Cerithioidea: Pachychilidae) on Sulawesi, Indonesia and its biogeographical implications." Biological Journal of the Linnean Society 85: 513–542. .

gemmifera
Gastropods described in 1897